The Atlanta Ballers were a basketball team based in Atlanta, Georgia. The team competed in the Junior Basketball Association (JBA), a league created for high school and junior college players as an alternative to the National Collegiate Athletic Association (NCAA).

History 
The JBA was first announced on December 20, 2017, when media personality LaVar Ball said to Slam magazine that he would create a professional league targeted at high school graduates and fully funded by his sports apparel company Big Baller Brand. In April 2018, the league held tryouts near Atlanta, at Pebblebrook High School in Mableton, Georgia to choose players for the Atlanta Ballers roster. Among the prospects selected was Corey Boyd, who earned the nickname "Big Jelly" at the tryout.

Final roster

References

External links 
JBA official website

Junior Basketball Association teams
Basketball teams in Atlanta
Basketball teams in the United States
Basketball teams established in 2018
2018 establishments in Georgia (U.S. state)